Eufrosinia Antonovna Kersnovskaya (8 January 1908 – 8 March 1994) was a Russian woman who spent 12 years in Gulag camps and wrote her memoirs in 12 notebooks, 2,200,000 characters, accompanied with 680 pictures.

She wrote three copies of the work. In 1968, friends typed samizdat copies, repeating the pictures on the back sides of the sheets. Excerpts from the work were first published in Ogonyok and Znamya magazines in 1990, as well as in The Observer (June 1990).  After that, German and French publications followed. In 2001 the complete text, in six volumes, was published in Russia.

Biography 

Eufrosinia Kersnovskaya was born in Odessa to a family of Russian gentry. During the Russian Civil War the family moved to their estate in Bessarabia to become farmers. Bessarabia was soon united with Romania.

In 1940, Bessarabia was annexed by the Soviet Union, and the Kersnovskaya family (Eufrosinia and her mother) were oppressed as former landowners. In June 1941 she was deported to Siberia as an exile settler (ссыльнопоселенец) to work as a logger.

In 1942 she attempted to escape, but was recaptured and sentenced to death. She refused to ask for clemency and wrote on a sheet of paper provided to her for this purpose: "I cannot demand justice, I do not want to ask for mercy". Kernovskaya's death sentence was nevertheless commuted to 10 years of labor camps, which she spent in the Norillag (Норильлаг, Norilsk labor camp) at mining works.

After the discharge in 1953 she lived in Yessentuki and wrote her memoirs during 1964–1968, which were published only in 1990.

Her memoirs are illustrated by hundreds of drawings of life in the Gulag. They are also remarkable for the quality of the drawings.

Bibliography 
Керсновская Е.А. "Наскальная живопись". - М.: КВАДРАТ, 1991;
Kersnovskaja Е. "Ach Herr wenn unsre Sünden uns verklagen". - Kiel: NEUER MALIK VERLAG, 1991.
Kersnovskaja Е. "Coupable de rien". - Paris: PLON, 1994.
Керсновская Е.А. "Сколько стоит человек". - 6 volumes, Moscow, ООО "МОЖАЙСК-ТЕРРА", 2000-2001.

See  also
Nikolai Getman
David Olère
Vann Nath
Vedem

References

External links
 "How Much Is a Person Worth?  in English" How Much Is a Person Worth?  English translation 
 How Much Is a Person Worth? 

Soviet rehabilitations
Writers from Odesa
1908 births
1994 deaths
Russian nobility
Russian prisoners sentenced to death
Soviet prisoners sentenced to death
Prisoners sentenced to death by the Soviet Union
Prisoners and detainees of the Soviet Union
Russian women writers
20th-century Russian painters
Norillag detainees